Not What You Want may refer to:
"Not What You Want", a song by Sleater-Kinney form their 1997 album Dig Me Out
"Not What You Want", a song by Cat Power from her 1996 album Myra Lee